N24, N-24 or N.24, may refer to:

Media
 N24 (Germany), now Welt, a German television channel
 E24 Näringsliv, formerly N24, a Swedish online business newspaper
 E24 Næringsliv, formerly N24, a Norwegian online business newspaper
 Național 24 Plus, a Romanian television channel

Other uses
 N24 (Long Island bus), a bus route
 Aston Martin Vantage N24, a British race car
 GAF N24 Nomad, an Australian utility aircraft
 
 Nieuport 24, a French First World War fighter aircraft
 Nitrogen-24, an isotope of nitrogen
 Non-24-hour sleep–wake disorder
 Nürburgring 24 Hours

See also
 List of N24 roads